Light show may refer to:

 Drone display
 Laser lighting display
 Liquid light show, light projected through colored oil
 Projection mapping, projecting a light display onto a building or other surface
 Christmas lights
 Meteor shower